Bradford School District is a school district in White County, Arkansas, United States.

References

External links
 

Education in White County, Arkansas
School districts in Arkansas